Como Secondary College is an independent public co-educational  specialist high day school, located in , a suburb of Perth, Western Australia. Established in 1969, the College caters for approximately 850 students from Year 7 to Year 12.

History

The College was constructed in 1968, with the first classes commencing in February 1969. The College is open to students of ages 12 to 18 (Year 7 to Year 12). It currently has nearly 900 students attending classes, and often take Rotary exchange students from overseas on school exchange.

College life
As defined by the School Education Act 1999, the Intake Area for Como Secondary College covers the entire suburbs of South Perth, Como, Manning, Salter Point, Karawara, Waterford and Wilson, with the feeder primary schools of Como, Collier, Manning, Wilson and Curtin.

15% of the student enrolments are from beyond the local catchment, attending the school's specialist studies programs. The diversity of the student population is broadened by the contributions of an International Students' program at the school and by students who come from all over the metropolitan area and regional Western Australia to be part of one of the specialist programs. Many regional students choose to board in the nearby Rotary House, Victoria Park.

The College offers international tours in hockey, golf, music, and the opportunity of travel to different international destinations with the World Challenge community service and humanitarian expedition every two years.

Golf
The Golf Academy is one of the most successful school programmes in Australia - with a string of local, state, national titles, and achievements to its credit. Over 16 professional golfers including Matt Jager, Kristie Smith and Hannah Green have graduated from the program, and the Academy holds five Australasian titles, five national teams’ titles, and thirteen state teams’ titles. The Como Golf Academy has won a number of state, national, international titles, and has had a significant number of state and national representatives as well as State and World Champions amongst its ranks.

Hockey
The Hockey Program is Australia's best school hockey program  - with both boys' and girls' teams dominating competitions in Western Australia every year. The College's Hockey Academy has won numerous State School Championship Titles.
 2000-2009, 2011-12, 2013-2017 David Bell Cup (Open Boys) Champions
 1995, 1997, 2000-02, 2004-05, 2007-11, 2016-17 Buchanan Cup (Open Girls) Champions
 2006-08, 2010-14, 2017 Ross Meadows Shield (Year 7-9 Mixed) Champions

On 18 August 2017, the Como Hockey Academy set a Guinness World Record for the Largest Hockey Lesson, the Lesson included 618 participants.

Notable alumni
 Kenny Bainhockey; Commonwealth Games (Scotland)
 Ian Burcherhockey; Kookaburras
 Craig Davieshockey; Olympian, World Champion, WAIS Athlete of the Year 1988/89
 Hannah Green golf professional. 2019 Women's PGA Championship winner. 
 Matt Jagergolf professional
 Rick Kulaczgolf professional
 Shelly Liddelowhockey; Olympian
 Kathryn Slatteryhockey; Olympian
 Kristie Smithgolf professional
 Celine Wildehockey; Olympian (Germany)

See also 

 List of schools in the Perth metropolitan area

References

External links 
 

Public high schools in Perth, Western Australia
1969 establishments in Australia
Educational institutions established in 1969
Como, Western Australia